Turtle is an Indian Hindi-language film directed by Dinesh S Yadav and Produced by Mr. Ashok H Choudhary. The film stars Sanjay Mishra, Amol Deshmukh, Teetu Verma, Yash Rajasthani, Ankit Sharma, Ramnath Choudhary and Monica Sharma. The film is based  on the issue of World Water Crisis. It had its premiere at the Jagran Film Festival on  2 July 2018 and has been selected in China Film Festival, Third Eye Asian Film Festival and Rajasthan International Film Festival.

At 66th National Film Awards, Turtle received the National Film Award for Best Rajasthani Film. The film is inspired by a real story of Mr. Ramkaran Choudhary (Bagod) from Village Dehlod, Rajasthan.

Synopsis  
In this folktale, Turtle, digs the earth to deepen the water. The film is a metaphorical depiction of the turtle where in a drought struck village of Rajasthan, Sanjay Mishra (as Ramkaran Choudhary), is churning the parched, sun baked earth, to extract water and the common folk indulged in a tug of war, rotating on his shell, desperate to quench their thirst.

Cast 
 Sanjay Mishra as Ramkaran Choudhary
  Teetu Verma  ( as Nanku )
 Amol Deshmukh as Shambhu
 Ankit Anil Sharma as Hari
 Monica Sharma as Ashok's mother
 Ramnath Choudhary as the Alghoza player and Long Mustache
 Yash Rajasthani as Ashok
 Zoya Shah as Reena

Filming 
Turtle has been shot in and around Jaipur, Phagi and Kudli village of Rajasthan.

Awards 
 The film Turtle won the National Film Award for Best Rajasthani Film at 66th National Film Awards in August 2019. After winning the award, Rajasthan CM Ashok Gehlot congratulated to producer Ashok Choudhary over the call.
The film won the Special Critic Award for Best Director in Hindi Feature Film at the Rajasthan International Film Festival (RIFF) in January 2019.

See also

 List of Hindi films
 List of Rajasthani-language films

References

External links 
 

2018 films
2010s Hindi-language films
Rajasthani-language films